Hungarian road categories are as follows:
 Gyorsforgalmi út (controlled-access highway):
Autópálya (motorway): 2+2 travel lanes and 1+1 emergency lane, central reservation, no at-grade intersections, speed limit: 130 kilometers per hour (81 mph)
Gyorsút (high-speed highway): 2+2 travel lanes, central reservation, few  at-grade intersections, speed limit: 110 kilometers per hour (68 mph)
Elsődrendű főút (primary arterial road or primary main road) (with one digit in their name, e.g.: 6-os főút)
Másodrendű főút (secondary main road) (with two or three digits, e.g.: 57-es főút)
Helyi út (local road) (with three or more digits)

Some of the national roads are part of the European route scheme.European routes passing through Hungary: E60; E65; E66; E68; E71; E73; E75; E77; E79 (Class A); E573; E653; E661 (Class B).

Highways

They have one lane in each direction, signs are white-on-blue and the normal speed limit is 130 km/h, in expressways 110 km/h.
According to the Állami Autópályakezelő Zrt. ("State Motorway Management Plc."), the total length of the Hungarian motorway system was 1,400.6 kilometers in 2013. The construction of the Hungarian motorway system started in 1964 with M7, which finished in 1975 between Budapest and Lake Balaton. The total length of the system reached 200 km in 1980, 500 km in 1998, and 1000 km in 2007.

 Motorways in Hungary:
M1  |  M3  |  M5  |  M6  |  M7  |  M8  |  M15    |  M30  |  M31  |  M35  |  M43  |  M44  |  M60  |  M70

 Expressways in Hungary (M - expressways, and R - fast roads):
M0  |  M2  |  M4  |  M9  |  M10  |  M19  |  M25  |  M34  |  M49  |  M51    |  M85 |  M86  |  M87
R11  |  R21  |  R23    |  R67  |  R76  |  R83

History
Development of the overall length (at the end of):

Main roads
They have one lane in each direction, signs are white-on-green and the normal speed limit is 90 km/h.

Primary main road
Roads categorized as state roads, class IIa are 2,224 km in total length and are marked with one, two, or some three-digit numbers.

Secondary main road
Roads categorized as state roads, class IIb are 2,224 km in total length and are marked with one, two, or some three-digit numbers.

Local roads
Minor, local roads in the country are designated as "local roads". The total length of these roads is 23,780 km and are marked with four or some five-digit numbers, while the rest have consisted of macadam and earthen roads.

European routes
The following European routes pass through Hungary:

Class A:
  E60: Nickelsdorf,  – Hegyeshalom – Győr – Tatabánya – Budapest – Szolnok – Püspökladány – Ártánd - Borș, 
  E65: Čunovo,  – Rajka – Csorna – Szombathely – Körmend – Zalaegerszeg – Nagykanizsa – Letenye - Goričan, 
  E66: Heiligenkreuz,  – Rábafüzes – Körmend – Ajka – Veszprém – Székesfehérvár
  E68: Szeged – Makó – Csanádpalota – Nădlac, 
  E71: Milhosť,  – Tornyosnémeti – Miskolc – Füzesabony – Hatvan – Budapest – Székesfehérvár – Siófok – Nagykanizsa – Letenye – Goričan, 
  E73: Budapest – Dunaújváros – Szekszárd – Mohács – Udvar – Duboševica, 
  E75: Čunovo,  – Rajka – Győr – Tatabánya – Budapest – Kecskemét – Szeged – Röszke - Horgoš, 
  E77: Šahy,  – Parassapuszta – Vác – Budapest
  E79: Miskolc – Polgár – Debrecen – Berettyóújfalu – Ártánd - Borș, 

Class B:
  E573: Püspökladány – Debrecen – Nyíregyháza – Záhony – Chop, 
 E575: Medveďov, Slovakia – Vámosszabadi – Győr
 E579: Nyíregyháza – Vásárosnamény – Beregsurány – Astey, 
  E653: Letenye – Tornyiszentmiklós – Pince, 
  E661: Lake Balaton – Nagyatád – Barcs – Terezino Polje,

See also
 Transport in Hungary

References

 
Hungary, Roads, Expressways and Motorways
Roads
Roads